Mansa District may refer to:
 Mansa District, Zambia
 Mansa district, Punjab, India

District name disambiguation pages